Abdul Hamid Mony (born March 14, 1989, in Ambon) is an Indonesian footballer who currently plays for Persiba Balikpapan in the Indonesia Super League.

Club statistics

References

External links

1989 births
Association football midfielders
Living people
People from Ambon, Maluku
Sportspeople from Maluku (province)
Indonesian footballers
Liga 1 (Indonesia) players
Persiba Balikpapan players